Kirill Sergeyevich Shestakov (born 19 June 1985) is a Russian former professional footballer.

His father Sergei Shestakov was also a professional footballer.

Career statistics

Club

References

External links
 Profile at playerhistory.com

1985 births
Living people
Russian footballers
Russian expatriate footballers
Expatriate footballers in Kazakhstan
Russian expatriate sportspeople in Kazakhstan
Kazakhstan Premier League players
FC Sodovik Sterlitamak players
FC Kairat players
FC Kaisar players
FC Aktobe players
Association football midfielders
FC Nosta Novotroitsk players